Stillman Ivan Rouse (September 22, 1917 – December 22, 1997) was an American football player. 

A native of St. Louis, Rouse attended McKinley High School and then played college football at the University of Missouri.

He also played professional football in the National Football League (NFL) as an end for the Detroit Lions. He appeared in 10 games for the Lions during the 1940 season. He was drafted into the Army in June 1941.

References

1917 births
1997 deaths
American football ends
Missouri Tigers football players
Detroit Lions players
Players of American football from St. Louis